Stefano Di Battista (born February 14, 1969) is an Italian jazz musician who plays soprano and alto saxophone.

Career 
Di Battista began playing at thirteen with friends and became interested in jazz after hearing Art Pepper. In Italy he received guidance from Massimo Urbani and by his twenties Di Battista was performing in Paris. He put out his debut as a leader in 1997 and has toured with the Elvin Jones Jazz Machine.

Discography
 Volare (Label Bleu, 1997)
 A Prima Vista (Blue Note, 1998)
 Stefano Di Battista (Blue Note, 2000)
  'Round About Roma (Blue Note, 2002)
 Parker's Mood (Blue Note, 2004)
 Trouble Shootin'  (Blue Note, 2007)
 Più Sole with Nicky Nicolai (EmArcy/Universal, 2009)
 Woman's Land (Alice, 2011)
 Giu' La Testa with Sylvain Luc (Just Looking, 2014)
 La Musica Di Noi (Alice, 2015)
 Italian Standards (Casa del Jazz, 2016)

References

External links

1969 births
Living people
Italian jazz saxophonists
Male saxophonists
Musicians from Rome
20th-century Italian musicians
21st-century Italian musicians
20th-century saxophonists
21st-century saxophonists
20th-century Italian male musicians
21st-century Italian male musicians
Male jazz musicians
Label Bleu artists